Prescot Urban District was a local government district in the administrative county of Lancashire, England from 1895 to 1974.the main settlement of the district was the town of Prescot.

In 1974 it was abolished and its former area was transferred to Merseyside to be combined with that of Huyton with Roby Urban District, Kirkby Urban District, parts of Whiston Rural District and parts of West Lancashire Rural District to form the present-day Metropolitan Borough of Knowsley.

References 

History of Lancashire
Metropolitan Borough of Knowsley
Districts of England created by the Local Government Act 1894
Districts of England abolished by the Local Government Act 1972
Urban districts of England